Heliopolis Sporting Club (HSC, Arabic transliteration transliteration: nādī Heliopolis al-reyādī) is one of Egypt's major sporting clubs.

Club's history 
The Heliopolis Sporting Club was founded in [Cairo] on January 1, 1910, by the [Cairo Electric Railways and Heliopolis Oases Company], which managed the club until December 31, 1921. On January 1, 1922, the club members took over the management by a contract signed with the company.

The activities of the club included water polo, swimming, diving, squash, tennis, golf, cricket, hockey, bridge, bowling, football, handball, basketball, volleyball, speed ball, ballet, gymnastics, snooker, athletics, and different kinds of dancing.

In 1947, the area of the club was reduced to its present size (around 19 [feddans]) after the company took back the land of the golf course. Golf was cancelled after the frequent objections of club members to the large expenses incurred by the game, which, in the end, was not played by many members.

Shorouk branch 
Like other major sporting clubs in Egypt, Heliopolis Sporting Club has another branch, in Shorouk city. The total area of the Shorouk branch is three times bigger than the main club in Heliopolis. Thus, that area is more suitable for all developmental and improving future possibilities, and we brought back the golf course.

Current sports

References

External links
 

Clubs and societies in Egypt
Sports clubs established in 1910
1910 establishments in Egypt
Sports clubs in Cairo
Sports venues in Egypt
Water polo clubs in Egypt